Sahibabad Assembly constituency is one of the 403 constituencies of the Uttar Pradesh Legislative Assembly, India. It is a part of the Ghaziabad district and one of the five assembly constituencies in the Ghaziabad Lok Sabha constituency. First election in this assembly constituency was held in 2012 after the "Delimitation of Parliamentary and Assembly Constituencies Order, 2008" was passed and the constituency was constituted in 2008. The constituency is assigned identification number 55.

Wards / Areas
Extent of Sahibabad Assembly constituency is PC Arthala, Makanpur of Loni KC, Ward Nos. 1, 8, 9, 13, 14, 16, 18, 19, 20, 25, 26, 30, 33, 38, 41, 50, 55 & 60 in Ghaziabad (M Corp.) of Ghaziabad Tehsil.

Members of the Legislative Assembly

Election results

2022

2017

See also
Ghaziabad district, India
Ghaziabad Lok Sabha constituency
Sixteenth Legislative Assembly of Uttar Pradesh
Uttar Pradesh Legislative Assembly

References

External links
 

Assembly constituencies of Uttar Pradesh
Ghaziabad district, India
Constituencies established in 2008
2008 establishments in Uttar Pradesh